Clarence Hobart and Harold Nisbet defeated George Hillyard and Sydney Smith 2–6, 6–2, 6–2, 6–3 in the All Comers' Final, but the reigning champions Laurence Doherty and Reginald Doherty defeated Hobart and Nisbet 6–4, 6–4, 6–2 in the challenge round to win the gentlemen's doubles tennis title at the 1898 Wimbledon Championships.

Draw

Challenge round

All Comers'

References

External links

Gentlemen's Doubles
Wimbledon Championship by year – Men's doubles